Auf Achse (a German expression meaning on the road, the literal translation would be on the axle) was a German television series on the ARD channel. The series ran from 1978 until 1996 and 86 episodes were produced altogether.

Plot 
In the first few episodes, Franz Meersdonk (Manfred Krug) is a trucker working for the Munich-based company, "Mittermann Haulage", driving mostly the Germany-Iran route. The company is run by Sylvia Mittermann (Monica Bleibtreu), who is friendly with Franz. One day, she lands a big delivery to Tehran, but Franz is the only driver she has left. Franz gets to know a washed up racing driver, Günther Willers (Rüdiger Kirschstein) and talks him into teaming up for the new assignment. All does not go smoothly, however. First, Franz's lorry is inadvertently switched for a stolen one, then a hitchhiker causes problems. Shortly before arriving, Günter's cab bursts into flames. But at long last, the goods are delivered successfully (although this is not depicted).

Back in Munich, the company has gone bankrupt, and the pair have to scramble to find new jobs. Just before Meersdonk is forced to sell his lorry, they connive to land another delivery run. Once an insurance fraud is cleared up in a later episode, they finally get the money together to form their own company: International Transport in Munich.

Season 5 takes place entirely in Turkey. Willers quits (for good this time after Willers had departed the series once before for 16 episodes). Meersdonk establishes a branch of the company in Turkey.

Most of the episodes involve auto theft, cargo scams, dubious acquaintances, or smuggling. Meersdonk and Willers get themselves into jams and get themselves back out. Trying to make successful deals, the good natured heroes are regularly taken advantage of or they get roughed up. So they remain what they are—truckers, even if they are their own bosses.

Details 
Over the series lifetime, the truckers traveled to most European countries, north Africa, the Republic of South Africa, Turkey, Chile, Mexico, and east Asia. Early in the series, when the action was set in a foreign country, the actors spoke their own language and no subtitles were provided, so that the viewer would experience the same communication problems as Franz and Günther. However, the series did not keep up this gimmick, especially not with the Namibia/South Africa episodes and the first two Mexico episodes.

Impact
As indicated by its long run, the show was fairly well received. It attained some cachet abroad for various reasons; it is referenced by the Franz Ferdinand song of the same name.

External links
 Auf Achse Episode Guide

1980s German television series
1977 German television series debuts
1996 German television series endings
German drama television series
German-language television shows
Das Erste original programming